Designation (from Latin designatio) is the process of determining an incumbent's successor. A candidate that won an election for example, is the designated holder of the office the candidate has been elected to, up until the candidate's inauguration. Titles typically held by such persons include, amongst others, "President-elect", and "Prime Minister-designate".

See also 
 Acting (law)
 -elect
 Nominee
 President-elect of the United States
 Prime Minister-designate

References 

International law
Legal terminology